Robinette Bernice Ramírez Casamalhuapa (born 25 December 1992) is an American-born Salvadoran footballer who plays as a midfielder. She has been a member of the El Salvador women's national team.

Early life
Ramírez was born in Los Angeles County, California.

International career
Ramírez capped for El Salvador at senior level during the 2012 CONCACAF Women's Olympic Qualifying Tournament qualification and the 2013 Central American Games.

International goals
Scores and results list El Salvador's goal tally first.

See also
List of El Salvador women's international footballers

References

1992 births
Living people
Citizens of El Salvador through descent
Salvadoran women's footballers
Women's association football midfielders
El Salvador women's international footballers
Sportspeople from Los Angeles County, California
Soccer players from California
American women's soccer players
American sportspeople of Salvadoran descent
21st-century American women